The Alaska State Library and Historical Collections and Talking Book Center are located on the second floor of the Andrew P. Kashevaroff Building in  Juneau, Alaska.

Mission statement
The Alaska State Library:
promotes and coordinates library services to the community of Alaskan libraries,
serves as the primary research library for state government, and
collects, preserves, and makes accessible Alaska-related materials.

About the Library
The State Library coordinates library services throughout the state and serves as the information resource for the state government and the Legislature. It includes the Historical Section, which collects Alaskana and preserves private papers and materials of historical value to the state. The State Library also collects, catalogs and makes available state agency publications. This is done through the Documents Depository, which distributes the publications to depository libraries throughout the state.

The State Library administers federal and state grants for public library construction and services. It coordinates the Alaska Library Network (ALN), which provides interlibrary loans, cooperative collection development, and resource sharing among libraries. The Governor's Advisory Council on Libraries advises on the federal long-range spending plan.

Since 1950, the library has offered a mail service that will transport books to patrons in remote areas of the state. The mail services allows for materials to be checked out for up to eight weeks with a chance to renew up to four additional weeks.

Talking Book Center
The Talking Book Center provides blind, visually impaired, and physically impaired individuals, who cannot read standard print, with audio books, large print, and Braille materials. The program serves the entire state and is free to those who are eligible.

Patrons of the service are also eligible to download thousands of available audio and braille books and magazines via Braille & Audio Reading Download (BARD) service. In September 2013, the BARD mobile application for iPhone, iPad, and iPod Touch became available as a free download in the iTunes App Store.  The Android mobile application is also available as a free download.

References

External links

Alaska State Library on Twitter
Alaska Historical Collections
Alaska Library Network
Alaska Talking Book Center
Alaska Talking Book Center on Facebook
RSS feeds available from the Alaska State Library

1900 establishments in Alaska
Buildings and structures in Juneau, Alaska
Culture of Juneau, Alaska
Education in Juneau, Alaska
Government agencies established in 1900
Libraries in Alaska
Public libraries in Alaska
State agencies of Alaska
State libraries of the United States
Libraries established in 1900